Crystal Rainbow Pyramid Under the Stars is an album by Acid Mothers Temple & The Melting Paraiso U.F.O., released in 2007 by Important Records. A vinyl tour LP also released by Important Records in 2007 under the shortened name Crystal Rainbow Pyramid containing the title track and a bonus track. The tour LP was limited to 1000 copies on splatter color vinyl.

Crystal Rainbow Pyramid Under the Stars is also the first album with Kitagawa Hao on vocals.

Track listing

CD Version

Vinyl Version

Credits 

Credits, as stated on the Acid Mothers website:

 Kitagawa Hao - voice, hot spice & alcohol
 Tsuyama Atsushi - monster bass, voice, cosmic joker
 Higashi Hiroshi - synthesizer, dancin' king
 Shimura Koji - drums, Latino cool
 Ono Ryoko - alto sax, aesthetic perverted karman
 Kawabata Makoto - electric guitar, electronics, speed guru

References 

2007 albums
Acid Mothers Temple albums
Important Records albums